Marat Azikhanovich Dzoblayev (born 1 September 1966) is a Russian professional football coach and a former player.

He made his professional debut in the Soviet Second League in 1983 for FC Spartak Ordzhonikidze. He played 2 games in the UEFA Cup 1993–94 for FC Spartak Vladikavkaz.

Honours
 Russian Premier League runner-up: 1992.

References

1966 births
People from Irafsky District
Living people
Soviet footballers
Association football midfielders
Russian footballers
FC Spartak Vladikavkaz players
Russian Premier League players
FC Lokomotiv Nizhny Novgorod players
FC Spartak Moscow players
PFC Spartak Nalchik players
Russian football managers
FC Spartak Vladikavkaz managers
FC Lokomotiv Saint Petersburg players
Sportspeople from North Ossetia–Alania